Fire Over the Sea (Italian: Fiamme sul mare) is a 1947 Italian drama film directed by Michał Waszyński and Vittorio Cottafavi and starring Carlo Ninchi Evi Maltagliati and Silvana Jachino.

It was shot at the Farnesina Studios of Titanus in Rome. The film's were designed by the art director Gastone Medin. It earned 45 million lira at the box office.

Synopsis
A partly submerged cargo ship is raised from the harbour in Naples by a collective of sailors, and made seaworthy again. It embarks on its first voyage to Buenos Aires. A wealthy businessman Matteo La Spina offers to buy the boat from them, revealing to his daughter Diana that he actually plans to set it alight during the return passage to Naples and claim the insurance money. She returns to the ship to try and save it, but accidentally triggers  the inflammable materials in the hold. Although the fire is put out, she dies in the process.

Cast
Carlo Ninchi as Stefano
 Evi Maltagliati as Dory Jane
 Silvana Jachino as Diana La Spina
 Edda Albertini as Alda
 Felice Romano as Gaspare Marani
 Giacomo Rondinella as Giovanni Proietti
 Giuseppe Varni as Matteo La Spina
 Leopoldo Valentini as Pietro Ferri
 Nando Del Luca as Paolo Santi
 Piero Palermini as Rio Marani
 Alfred Rizzo as Barbiere in Argentina

References

Bibliography
 Anile, Alberto. Orson Welles in Italy. Indiana University Press, 2013.
 Chiti, Roberto & Poppi, Roberto. Dizionario del cinema italiano: Dal 1945 al 1959. Gremese Editore, 1991.

External links 
 
 Fiamme sul mare at Variety Distribution

1947 films
1940s Italian-language films
Italian black-and-white films
Films directed by Michał Waszyński
1947 drama films
Films directed by Vittorio Cottafavi
Italian drama films
Seafaring films
Films set in Naples
Films set in Buenos Aires
1940s Italian films